Farnsworth may refer to:

Places
Farnsworth, Indiana, a ghost town
Farnsworth, Texas, an unincorporated community in the Texas Panhandle
Farnsworth Peak, a mountain located west of Salt Lake City, Utah

People
Farnsworth (surname), a list of people and fictional characters
Farnsworth Donald (1952), American artist, inventor, papermaker
Farnsworth Wright (1888–1940), editor of the pulp magazine Weird Tales

Other uses
Farnsworth Art Museum, Rockland, Maine
Farnsworth House (disambiguation), various places
Farnsworth Lantern Test, used to screen for color blindness
Farnsworth Middle School, Guilderland Central School District, Guilderland, New York
Farnsworth Metropark, near Toledo, Ohio
Farnsworth method of learning Morse code
Farnsworth, a diesel engine in the 1991 movie The Little Engine that Could

See also
Gen. Charles S. Farnsworth County Park, located in Altadena, California
 Farnworth (disambiguation)